Professor Christine Elizabeth Fell  OBE (1938 – 1998) taught English at the University of Nottingham from 1971 unto 1993. She was awarded a first-class Honors in English from Royal Holloway, University of London and later completed an M.A. in the Department of Scandinavian Studies at University College London. Professor Fell was Pro-Vice Chancellor of the University of Nottingham from 1986 to 1989, and Head of the English department from 1990 to 1993. She moved onto become the first Director of Humanities Research Centre in 1994, continuing until her retirement in 1997 due to ill health.

Her interests were in Old English vocabulary and semantics and she established Nottingham as a leading centre for Viking Studies.
Her book Women in Anglo-Saxon England, has been published in 31 different editions and format.

She was appointed an OBE for her contribution to Early English Studies. She died in 1998 and is commemorated by a trust fund set up in her name, and a sundial on the wall of Highfields House, inscribed in Anglo-Saxon in the manner of the dial from Kirkdale church, North Yorkshire.

Publications

   There are 31 listed editions.

References

1938 births
1998 deaths
Academics of the University of Nottingham
Alumni of Royal Holloway, University of London
Alumni of University College London
Anglo-Saxon studies scholars
Members of the Order of the British Empire
Old Norse studies scholars